Andoa is a genus of mosses belonging to the family Hypnaceae.

The species of this genus are found in Southwestern Europe.

Species:
 Andoa berthelotiana Ochyra, 1982

References

Hypnaceae
Moss genera